Scaphocalyx is a monotypic genus of flowering plants belonging to the family Achariaceae. The only species is Scaphocalyx spathacea.

Its native range is Thailand to Western Malesia.

References

Achariaceae
Monotypic Malpighiales genera